Russia competed at the 2019 Military World Games in Wuhan from 18 to 27 October 2019. It sent a delegation consisting of 243 athletes competing in 21 sports for the event. Russia finished the event with 161 medals, just second behind to tournament hosts China's medal tally of 239.

Participants 

Source

Medal summary

Medal by sports

Medalists

References 

Nations at the 2019 Military World Games
2019 in Russian sport